The Hamrahlid Choir or Hamrahlíðarkórinn as it is called in Icelandic was founded in 1981 by Þorgerður Ingólfsdóttir, who remains its conductor. The choir consists of alumni of Menntaskólinn við Hamrahlíð (Hamrahlid College) in Iceland who were formerly members of The Choir of Hamrahlid College, conducted by Ingólfsdóttir until 2017.

Although the Hamrahlíð Choir is primarily devoted to musical education, it has from the very beginning been dedicated to giving performances of the highest quality. The choir sings with a pure, flexible, well-blended sound, and it performs with exuberance and a youthful sense of discovery. Critics throughout the world have praised its accurate intonation, clear diction, and the high level of enthusiasm and commitment that are among the hallmarks of the choir's music-making.

The choir has traveled extensively and toured dozens of countries in Europe, North America and Asia, as well as Israel and collaborated with renowned conductors such as Tõnu Kaljuste, Osmo Vänskä, Lukas Foss, László Heltay, Robert King, Timothy Brown, Gustav Sjökvist, Willi Gohl, Hansruedi Willisegger, Johan Dujick, Petri Sakari and Thomas Adés. Recent ventures include the 2015 Europa Cantat festival in Pécs, Hungary and the 2017 Aberdeen International Youth Festival in Scotland. The choir has also made a career in Iceland by singing big pieces by composers such as Mozart, Beethoven, Stravinsky with the distinguished Iceland Symphony Orchestra.

Throughout its history, the choir has collaborated closely with Icelandic composers. Over 100 works have been composed especially for the choir, including works by virtually all of Iceland's leading composers. Apart from its close association with native composers, the choir has collaborated with foreign artist such as Arvo Pärt, John Cage and Vagn Holmboe in the first Icelandic performances of their works. Arvo Pärt was so impressed with the choir's performance of his Te Deum in 1998 that he composed a choral work dedicated to Þorgerður Ingólfsdóttir, Which was the son of..., which was premièred in 2000.

The choir was awarded Performer of the year at the 2002 Icelandic Music Awards and has released several CDs and gramophone records.

Discography

Albums
1982: Mattheusarpassía/ St Matthew Passion (credited to Pólýfónkórinn, Hamrahlíðarkórinn, Kór Öldutúnsskóla og 2 kammersveitir)
1988: Kveðið í bjargi/ Invocation from the Rock
1990: Turtil dúfan, jarðaberið og úlfaldalestin/ The Turtle Dove, the Strawberry and the Desert Caravan
1993: Íslensk þjóðlög/ Icelandic Folk Songs
1996: Íslenskir jólasöngvar og Maríukvæði/ Icelandic Christmas Songs and Hymns to the Virgin
2002: Vorkvæði um Ísland/ Icelandic Spring Poem
2003: Mansöngur um Ólafs rímu Grænlendings/ Ballad of Olaf the Greenlander
2008: Þorkell/ Choral Music by Þorkell Sigurbjörnsson
2009: Jólasagan/ The Christmas Story
2013: Djúpsins ró/ Calm of the Deep (with Nordic Affect)
2017: Íslenskir Jólasöngvar Og Maríukvæði: Icelandic Christmas Songs
2020: Come and be Joyful

References

External links 

Webpage of the choir

Icelandic choirs
University choirs
Musical groups established in 1981
1981 establishments in Iceland